Max Bruch's Violin Concerto No. 2 in D minor, Op. 44 was composed during 1877, following a failed attempt in 1874, and dedicated to the great Spanish violinist, Pablo de Sarasate. It was premiered in London by Sarasate, conducted by Bruch, on 4 November 1877.

Structure

The concerto has three movements:

A typical performance runs 28 to 30 minutes.

References
Notes

Sources

External links
 
 

Concertos by Max Bruch
Bruch 02
1877 compositions
Compositions in D minor